Wendlandia heynei (ukan pansara in Pakistan), (simtaaraa in Nepal) is an evergreen tree species in the family Rubiaceae.

References

heynei
Flora of the Indian subcontinent